Proto-Indo-European (PIE) is the reconstructed common ancestor of the Indo-European language family. Its proposed features have been derived by linguistic reconstruction from documented Indo-European languages. No direct record of Proto-Indo-European exists.

Far more work has gone into reconstructing PIE than any other proto-language, and it is the best understood of all proto-languages of its age. The majority of linguistic work during the 19th century was devoted to the reconstruction of PIE or its daughter languages, and many of the modern techniques of linguistic reconstruction (such as the comparative method) were developed as a result.

PIE is hypothesized to have been spoken as a single language from 4500 BC to 2500 BC during the Late Neolithic to Early Bronze Age, though estimates vary by more than a thousand years. According to the prevailing Kurgan hypothesis, the original homeland of the Proto-Indo-Europeans may have been in the Pontic–Caspian steppe of eastern Europe. The linguistic reconstruction of PIE has provided insight into the pastoral culture and patriarchal religion of its speakers.

As speakers of Proto-Indo-European became isolated from each other through the Indo-European migrations, the regional dialects of Proto-Indo-European spoken by the various groups diverged, as each dialect underwent shifts in pronunciation (the Indo-European sound laws), morphology, and vocabulary. Over many centuries, these dialects transformed into the known ancient Indo-European languages. From there, further linguistic divergence led to the evolution of their current descendants, the modern Indo-European languages. Today, the descendant languages of PIE with the most native speakers are Spanish, English, Portuguese, Hindustani (Hindi and Urdu), Bengali, Russian, Punjabi, German, Persian, French, Marathi, Italian, and Gujarati.

PIE is believed to have had an elaborate system of morphology that included inflectional suffixes (analogous to English child, child's, children, children's) as well as ablaut (vowel alterations, as preserved in English sing, sang, sung, song) and accent. PIE nominals and pronouns had a complex system of declension, and verbs similarly had a complex system of conjugation. The PIE phonology, particles, numerals, and copula are also well-reconstructed.

Asterisks are used as a conventional mark of reconstructed words, such as *, *, or *; these forms are the reconstructed ancestors of the modern English words water, hound, and three, respectively.

Development of the hypothesis
No direct evidence of PIE exists; scholars have reconstructed PIE from its present-day descendants using the comparative method. For example, compare the pairs of words in Italian and English:  and foot,  and father,  and fish. Since there is a consistent correspondence of the initial consonants (p and f) that emerges far too frequently to be coincidental, one can infer that these languages stem from a common parent language. Detailed analysis suggests a system of sound laws to describe the phonetic and phonological changes from the hypothetical ancestral words to the modern ones. These laws have become so detailed and reliable as to support the Neogrammarian rule: the Indo-European sound laws apply without exception.

William Jones, an Anglo-Welsh philologist and puisne judge in Bengal, caused an academic sensation when he postulated the common ancestry of Sanskrit, Greek, Latin, Gothic, the Celtic languages, and Old Persian in 1786, but he was not the first to state such a hypothesis. In the 16th century, European visitors to the Indian subcontinent became aware of similarities between Indo-Iranian languages and European languages, and as early as 1653, Marcus Zuerius van Boxhorn had published a proposal for a proto-language ("Scythian") for the following language families: Germanic, Romance, Greek, Baltic, Slavic, Celtic, and Iranian. According to current academic consensus, Jones's famous work of 1786 was less accurate than his predecessors', as he erroneously included Egyptian, Japanese and Chinese in the Indo-European languages, while omitting Hindi.

In 1818, Rasmus Christian Rask elaborated the set of correspondences in his prize essay  ('Investigation of the Origin of the Old Norse or Icelandic Language'), where he argued that Old Norse was related to the Germanic languages, and had even suggested a relation to the Baltic, Slavic, Greek, Latin and Romance languages. In 1816, Franz Bopp published On the System of Conjugation in Sanskrit, in which he investigated the common origin of Sanskrit, Persian, Greek, Latin, and German. In 1833, he began publishing the Comparative Grammar of Sanskrit, Zend, Greek, Latin, Lithuanian, Old Slavic, Gothic, and German.

In 1822, Jacob Grimm formulated what became known as Grimm's law as a general rule in his . Grimm showed correlations between the Germanic and other Indo-European languages and demonstrated that sound change systematically transforms all words of a language. From the 1870s, the Neogrammarians proposed that sound laws have no exceptions, as illustrated by Verner's law, published in 1876, which resolved apparent exceptions to Grimm's law by exploring the role of accent (stress) in language change.

August Schleicher's A Compendium of the Comparative Grammar of the Indo-European, Sanskrit, Greek and Latin Languages (1874–77) represented an early attempt to reconstruct the proto-Indo-European language.

By the early 1900s, Indo-Europeanists had developed well-defined descriptions of PIE which scholars still accept today. Later, the discovery of the Anatolian and Tocharian languages added to the corpus of descendant languages. A subtle new principle won wide acceptance: the laryngeal theory, which explained irregularities in the reconstruction of Proto-Indo-European phonology as the effects of hypothetical sounds which no longer exist in all languages documented prior to the excavation of cuneiform tablets in Anatolian. This theory was first proposed by De Saussure in 1879 on the basis of internal reconstruction only, and progressively won general acceptance after Jerzy Kuryłowicz's discovery of consonantal reflexes of these reconstructed sounds in Hittite.

Julius Pokorny's  ('Indo-European Etymological Dictionary', 1959) gave a detailed, though conservative, overview of the lexical knowledge accumulated by 1959. Jerzy Kuryłowicz's 1956 Apophonie gave a better understanding of Indo-European ablaut. From the 1960s, knowledge of Anatolian became robust enough to establish its relationship to PIE.

Historical and geographical setting

Scholars have proposed multiple hypotheses about when, where, and by whom PIE was spoken. The Kurgan hypothesis, first put forward in 1956 by Marija Gimbutas, has become the most popular. It proposes that the original speakers of PIE were the Yamnaya culture associated with the kurgans (burial mounds) on the Pontic–Caspian steppe north of the Black Sea. According to the theory, they were nomadic pastoralists who domesticated the horse, which allowed them to migrate across Europe and Asia in wagons and chariots. By the early 3rd millennium BC, they had expanded throughout the Pontic–Caspian steppe and into eastern Europe.

Other theories include the Anatolian hypothesis, which posits that PIE spread out from Anatolia with agriculture beginning  7500–6000 BC, the Armenian hypothesis, the Paleolithic continuity paradigm, and the indigenous Aryans theory. The latter two of these theories are not regarded as credible within academia. Out of all the theories for a PIE homeland, the Kurgan and Anatolian hypotheses are the ones most widely accepted, and also the ones most debated against each other. The location of the PIE homeland is considered to be the biggest controversy in PIE studies, which some linguists think may never be solved.

Descendants

The table lists the main Indo-European language families, comprising the languages descended from Proto-Indo-European.

Commonly proposed subgroups of Indo-European languages include Italo-Celtic, Graeco-Aryan, Graeco-Armenian, Graeco-Phrygian, Daco-Thracian, and Thraco-Illyrian.

There are numerous lexical similarities between the Proto-Indo-European and Proto-Kartvelian languages due to early language contact, though some morphological similarities—notably the Indo-European ablaut, which is remarkably similar to the root ablaut system reconstructible for Proto-Kartvelian.

Marginally attested languages
The Lusitanian language was a marginally attested language spoken in areas near the border between present-day Portugal and Spain.

The Venetic and Liburnian languages known from the North Adriatic region are sometimes classified as Italic.

Albanian and Greek are the only surviving Indo-European descendants of a Paleo-Balkan language area, named for their occurrence in or in the vicinity of the Balkan peninsula. Most of the other languages of this area—including Illyrian, Thracian, and Dacian—do not appear to be members of any other subfamilies of PIE, but are so poorly attested that proper classification of them is not possible. Forming an exception, Phrygian is sufficiently well-attested to allow proposals of a particularly close affiliation with Greek, and a Graeco-Phrygian branch of Indo-European is becoming increasingly accepted.

Phonology

Proto-Indo-European phonology has been reconstructed in some detail. Notable features of the most widely accepted (but not uncontroversial) reconstruction include:
three series of stop consonants reconstructed as voiceless, voiced, and breathy voiced;
sonorant consonants that could be used syllabically;
three so-called laryngeal consonants, whose exact pronunciation is not well-established but which are believed to have existed in part based on their detectable effects on adjacent sounds;
the fricative 
The existence of /a/ as a separate phoneme is debated.

Notation

Vowels
The vowels in commonly used notation are:

Consonants

The corresponding consonants in commonly used notation are:

Accent
The Proto-Indo-European accent is reconstructed today as having had variable lexical stress, which could appear on any syllable and whose position often varied among different members of a paradigm (e.g. between singular and plural of a verbal paradigm). Stressed syllables received a higher pitch; therefore it is often said that PIE had a pitch accent. The location of the stress is associated with ablaut variations, especially between normal-grade vowels ( and ) and zero-grade (i.e. lack of a vowel), but not entirely predictable from it.

The accent is best preserved in Vedic Sanskrit and (in the case of nouns) Ancient Greek, and indirectly attested in a number of phenomena in other IE languages, such as Verner's Law in the Germanic branch. Sources for Indo-European accentuation are also the Balto-Slavic accentual system and plene spelling in Hittite cuneiform. To account for mismatches between the accent of Vedic Sanskrit and Ancient Greek, as well as a few other phenomena, a few historical linguists prefer to reconstruct PIE as a tone language where each morpheme had an inherent tone; the sequence of tones in a word then evolved, according to that hypothesis, into the placement of lexical stress in different ways in different IE branches.

Morphology

Root
Proto-Indo-European roots were affix-lacking morphemes that carried the core lexical meaning of a word and were used to derive related words (cf. the English root "-friend-", from which are derived related words such as friendship, friendly, befriend, and newly coined words such as unfriend). Proto-Indo-European was probably a fusional language, in which inflectional morphemes signaled the grammatical relationships between words. This dependence on inflectional morphemes means that roots in PIE, unlike those in English, were rarely used without affixes. A root plus a suffix formed a word stem, and a word stem plus a desinence (usually an ending) formed a word.

Ablaut
Many morphemes in Proto-Indo-European had short e as their inherent vowel; the Indo-European ablaut is the change of this short e to short o, long e (ē), long o (ō), or no vowel. This variation in vowels occurred both within inflectional morphology (e.g., different grammatical forms of a noun or verb may have different vowels) and derivational morphology (e.g., a verb and an associated abstract verbal noun may have different vowels).

Categories that PIE distinguished through ablaut were often also identifiable by contrasting endings, but the loss of these endings in some later Indo-European languages has led them to use ablaut alone to identify grammatical categories, as in the Modern English words sing, sang, sung.

Noun
Proto-Indo-European nouns were probably declined for eight or nine cases:
nominative: marks the subject of a verb, such as They in They ate. Words that follow a linking verb (copulative verb) and restate the subject of that verb also use the nominative case. Thus, both They and linguists are in the nominative case in They are linguists. The nominative is the dictionary form of the noun.
accusative: used for the direct object of a transitive verb.
genitive: marks a noun as modifying another noun.
dative: used to indicate the indirect object of a transitive verb, such as Jacob in Maria gave Jacob a drink.
instrumental: marks the instrument or means by, or with, which the subject achieves or accomplishes an action. It may be either a physical object or an abstract concept.
ablative: used to express motion away from something.
locative: expresses location, corresponding vaguely to the English prepositions in, on, at, and by.
vocative: used for a word that identifies an addressee. A vocative expression is one of direct address where the identity of the party spoken to is set forth expressly within a sentence. For example, in the sentence, "I don't know, John", John is a vocative expression that indicates the party being addressed.
allative: used as a type of locative case that expresses movement towards something. It was preserved in Anatolian (particularly Old Hittite), and fossilized traces of it have been found in Greek. It is also present in Tocharian. Its PIE shape is uncertain, with candidates including *-h2(e), *-(e)h2, or *-a.
Late Proto-Indo-European had three grammatical genders:
 masculine
 feminine
 neuter
This system is probably derived from an older two-gender system, attested in Anatolian languages: common (or animate) and neuter (or inanimate) gender. The feminine gender only arose in the later period of the language. Neuter nouns collapsed the nominative, vocative and accusative into a single form, the plural of which used a special collective suffix  (manifested in most descendants as -a).

All nominals distinguished three numbers:
 singular
 dual
 plural
These numerals were also distinguished in verbs (see below), requiring agreement with their subject nominal.

Pronoun
Proto-Indo-European pronouns are difficult to reconstruct, owing to their variety in later languages. PIE had personal pronouns in the first and second grammatical person, but not the third person, where demonstrative pronouns were used instead. The personal pronouns had their own unique forms and endings, and some had two distinct stems; this is most obvious in the first person singular where the two stems are still preserved in English I and me. There were also two varieties for the accusative, genitive and dative cases, a stressed and an enclitic form.

Verb
Proto-Indo-European verbs, like the nouns, exhibited a system of ablaut.

The most basic categorisation for the reconstructed Indo-European verb is grammatical aspect. Verbs are classed as:
stative: verbs that depict a state of being
imperfective: verbs depicting ongoing, habitual or repeated action
perfective: verbs depicting a completed action or actions viewed as an entire process.
Verbs have at least four grammatical moods:
indicative: indicates that something is a statement of fact; in other words, to express what the speaker considers to be a known state of affairs, as in declarative sentences.
imperative: forms commands or requests, including the giving of prohibition or permission, or any other kind of advice or exhortation.
subjunctive: used to express various states of unreality such as wish, emotion, possibility, judgment, opinion, obligation, or action that has not yet occurred
optative: indicates a wish or hope. It is similar to the cohortative mood and is closely related to the subjunctive mood.
Verbs had two grammatical voices:
 active: used in a clause whose subject expresses the main verb's agent.
mediopassive: for the middle voice and the passive voice.
Verbs had three grammatical persons: first, second and third.

Verbs had three grammatical numbers:
singular
dual: referring to precisely two of the entities (objects or persons) identified by the noun or pronoun.
plural: a number other than singular or dual.

Verbs were probably marked by a highly developed system of participles, one for each combination of tense and voice, and an assorted array of verbal nouns and adjectival formations.

The following table shows a possible reconstruction of the PIE verb endings from Sihler, which largely represents the current consensus among Indo-Europeanists.

Numbers
Proto-Indo-European numerals are generally reconstructed as follows:

Rather than specifically 100, * may originally have meant "a large number".

Particle
Proto-Indo-European particles were probably used both as adverbs and as postpositions. These postpositions became prepositions in most daughter languages.

Reconstructed particles include for example, * "under, below"; the negators *, *; the conjunctions * "and", * "or" and others; and an interjection, *, expressing woe or agony.

Derivational morphology
Proto-Indo-European employed various means of deriving words from other words, or directly from verb roots.

Internal derivation
Internal derivation was a process that derived new words through changes in accent and ablaut alone. It was not as productive as external (affixing) derivation, but is firmly established by the evidence of various later languages.

Possessive adjectives
Possessive or associated adjectives were probably created from nouns through internal derivation. Such words could be used directly as adjectives, or they could be turned back into a noun without any change in morphology, indicating someone or something characterised by the adjective. They were probably also used as the second elements in compounds. If the first element was a noun, this created an adjective that resembled a present participle in meaning, e.g. "having much rice" or "cutting trees". When turned back into nouns, such compounds were Bahuvrihis or semantically resembled agent nouns.

In thematic stems, creating a possessive adjective seems to have involved shifting the accent one syllable to the right, for example:
 *tómh₁-o-s "slice" (Greek tómos) > *tomh₁-ó-s "cutting" (i.e. "making slices"; Greek tomós) > *dr-u-tomh₁-ó-s "cutting trees" (Greek drutómos "woodcutter" with irregular accent).
 *wólh₁-o-s "wish" (Sanskrit vára-) > *wolh₁-ó-s "having wishes" (Sanskrit vará- "suitor").

In athematic stems, there was a change in the accent/ablaut class. The reconstructed four classes followed an ordering in which a derivation would shift the class one to the right:
 acrostatic → proterokinetic → hysterokinetic → amphikinetic
The reason for this particular ordering of the classes in derivation is not known. Some examples:
 Acrostatic *krót-u-s ~ *krét-u-s "strength" (Sanskrit krátu-) > proterokinetic *krét-u-s ~ *kr̥t-éw-s "having strength, strong" (Greek kratús).
 Hysterokinetic *ph₂-tḗr ~ *ph₂-tr-és "father" (Greek patḗr) > amphikinetic *h₁su-péh₂-tōr ~ *h₁su-ph₂-tr-és "having a good father" (Greek εὑπάτωρ, eupátōr).

Vrddhi
A vrddhi derivation, named after the Sanskrit grammatical term, signifying "of, belonging to, descended from". It was characterised by "upgrading" the root grade, from zero to full (e) or from full to lengthened (ē). When upgrading from zero to full grade, the vowel could sometimes be inserted in the "wrong" place, creating a different stem from the original full grade.

Examples:
 full grade *swéḱuro-s "father-in-law" (Vedic Sanskrit ) > lengthened grade *swēḱuró-s "relating to one's father-in-law" (Vedic , Old High German swāgur "brother-in-law").
 full grade *dyḗw-s > zero grade *diw-és "sky" > new full grade *deyw-o-s "god, sky god" (Vedic , Latin deus, etc.). Note the difference in vowel placement, *dyew- in the full-grade stem of the original noun, but  in the vrddhi derivative.

Nominalization
Adjectives with accent on the thematic vowel could be turned into nouns by moving the accent back onto the root. A zero grade root could remain so, or be "upgraded" to full grade like in a vrddhi derivative. Some examples:
 PIE *ǵn̥h₁-tó-s "born" (Vedic jātá-) > *ǵénh₁-to- "thing that is born" (German Kind).
 Greek leukós "white" > leũkos "a kind of fish", literally "white one".
 Vedic kṛṣṇá- "dark" > kṛ́ṣṇa- "dark one", also "antelope".

This kind of derivation is likely related to the possessive adjectives, and can be seen as essentially the reverse of it.

Affixal derivation

Syntax
The syntax of the older Indo-European languages has been studied in earnest since at least the late nineteenth century, by such scholars as Hermann Hirt and Berthold Delbrück. In the second half of the twentieth century, interest in the topic increased and led to reconstructions of Proto-Indo-European syntax.

Since all the early attested IE languages were inflectional, PIE is thought to have relied primarily on morphological markers, rather than word order, to signal syntactic relationships within sentences. Still, a default (unmarked) word order is thought to have existed in PIE. In 1892, Jacob Wackernagel reconstructed PIE's word order as subject–verb–object (SVO), based on evidence in Vedic Sanskrit.

Winfred P. Lehmann (1974), on the other hand, reconstructs PIE as a subject–object–verb (SOV) language. He posits that the presence of person marking in PIE verbs motivated a shift from OV to VO order in later dialects. Many of the descendant languages have VO order: modern Greek, Romance and Albanian prefer SVO, Insular Celtic has VSO as the default order, and even the Anatolian languages show some signs of this word order shift. Tocharian and Indo-Iranian, meanwhile, retained the conservative OV order. Lehmann attributes the context-dependent order preferences in Baltic, Slavic and Germanic to outside influences. Donald Ringe (2006), however, attributes these to internal developments instead.

Paul Friedrich (1975) disagrees with Lehmann's analysis. He reconstructs PIE with the following syntax:
 basic SVO word order
 adjectives before nouns
 head nouns before genitives
 prepositions rather than postpositions
 no dominant order in comparative constructions
 main clauses before relative clauses
Friedrich notes that even among those Indo-European languages with basic OV word order, none of them are rigidly OV. He also notes that these non-rigid OV languages mainly occur in parts of the IE area that overlap with OV languages from other families (such as Uralic and Dravidian), whereas VO is predominant in the central parts of the IE area. For these reasons, among others, he argues for a VO common ancestor.

Hans Henrich Hock (2015) reports that the SVO hypothesis still has some adherents, but the "broad consensus" among PIE scholars is that PIE would have been an SOV language. The SOV default word order with other orders used to express emphasis (e.g., verb–subject–object to emphasise the verb) is attested in Old Indo-Aryan, Old Iranian, Old Latin and Hittite, while traces of it can be found in the enclitic personal pronouns of the Tocharian languages.

In popular culture 
The Ridley Scott film Prometheus features an android named David (played by Michael Fassbender) who learns Proto-Indo-European to communicate with the Engineer, an extraterrestrial whose race may have created humans. David practices PIE by reciting Schleicher's fable. Linguist Dr Anil Biltoo created the film's reconstructed dialogue and had an onscreen role teaching David Schleicher's fable.

The 2014 classical crossover album The Drop That Contained the Sea by Christopher Tin features songs in a number of different languages, including Proto-Indo-European, centering around the theme of water.

The 2016 video game Far Cry Primal, set in around 10,000 BC, features dialects of Wenja, an invented language based largely on PIE, intended to be its fictional predecessor. Linguists constructed three dialects —Wenja, Udam and Izila— one for each of the three featured tribes; while the two former are more archaic, Izila is essentially the standard academic version of PIE, with a few simplifications to make it easier for the actors to pronounce it.

See also
 Indo-European vocabulary
 Proto-Indo-European verbs
 Proto-Indo-European pronouns
 List of Indo-European languages
 Indo-European sound laws

Notes

References

Bibliography
 
 
 Clackson, J. (2007). Indo-European Linguistics: An Introduction (Cambridge Textbooks in Linguistics). Cambridge: Cambridge University Press. doi:10.1017/CBO9780511808616
 
 
 
 
 

2017. Volume 1 Handbook of Comparative and Historical Indo-European Linguistics. Berlin, Boston: De Gruyter Mouton. https://doi.org/10.1515/9783110261288
2017. Volume 2 Handbook of Comparative and Historical Indo-European Linguistics: An International Handbook. Berlin, Boston: De Gruyter Mouton. https://doi.org/10.1515/9783110523874
2018. Volume 3 Handbook of Comparative and Historical Indo-European Linguistics. Berlin, Boston: De Gruyter Mouton. https://doi.org/10.1515/9783110542431

External links

 At the University of Texas Linguistic Research Center: List of online books , Indo-European Lexicon
 Proto-Indo-European Lexicon at the University of Helsinki, Department of Modern Languages, Department of World Cultures, Indo-European Studies
 
 Indo-European Grammar, Syntax & Etymology Dictionary
 Indo-European Lexical Cognacy Database
 glottothèque – Ancient Indo-European Grammars online, an online collection of video lectures on Ancient Indo-European languages

 
Bronze Age
Indo-European languages
Language
Indo-European